Frederick William Adolphus Skae (1842–1881) was a notable New Zealand psychiatrist and health administrator. He was born in Edinburgh, Midlothian, Scotland in 1842.

References

1842 births
1881 deaths
New Zealand psychiatrists
Scottish emigrants to New Zealand
19th-century New Zealand medical doctors